Kayalık is a village in the Çukurca District in Hakkâri Province in Turkey. The village is populated by Kurds of the Pinyanişî tribe and had a population of 80 in 2022. The hamlets of Çeltik, Güzeldere, Kaynak and Meşeli are attached to Kayalık.

The village was depopulated in the 1990s during the Kurdish–Turkish conflict.

Population 
Population history of the village from 2007 to 2022:

References 

Kurdish settlements in Hakkâri Province
Villages in Çukurca District